Raony Carvalho (born 10 April 1987), also known as Ray Carvalho, is a Brazilian former professional tennis player.

Born in Brasília, Carvalho was ranked in the top 10 of the ITF junior rankings and made a Davis Cup appearance for Brazil as 17-year-old in 2004. He played the doubles rubber in a tie against Venezuela, which he and partner Caio Zampieri lost to Kepler Orellana and Jimy Szymanski. Before turning professional he played collegiate in the United States tennis for Texas Tech. He won three ITF Futures doubles titles during his career.

Carvalho has a sister, Larissa, who competed on the WTA Tour.

ITF Futures finals

Doubles: 8 (3–5)

See also
List of Brazil Davis Cup team representatives

References

External links
 
 
 

1987 births
Living people
Brazilian male tennis players
Sportspeople from Brasília
Texas Tech Red Raiders athletes